Tiniente Rosario is a 1937 black and white Filipino war film featuring Lucita Goyena.

Synopsis
The film follows the story of a female revolutionary leader who led a thousand-strong force of Katipunero men in a struggle for independence in 1896, along with her unwavering love for one of her men.

Production
The film was released on June 17, 1937, at Fox & Savoy theater, and according to the movie flyers, Tiniente Rosario and was a high-budget film notable for its multi-camera shots and casting of a "thousand extras" who play the Filipino and Spanish Forces.

Lost Status
Like the other pre-war films of the Philippine cinema, Tiniente Rosario is considered to be a lost film. The original reels or prints are believed to have been lost during the Battle of Manila in 1945. A few posters and leaflets survive as visual records of the film.

Cast
 Lucita Goyena
 Rogelio de la Rosa
 Andres Centenera
 Sylvia Rosales
 Precioso Palma 
 Teodoro "Teddy" Benavidez

See also
 Cinema of the Philippines
 Philippine revolution

External links

1937 films
Philippine silent films
Tagalog-language films
1937 romantic drama films
Philippine war films
Lost Philippine films
Philippine black-and-white films